The Crystal River Hatchery is a Colorado Parks and Wildlife cold-water fish production facility located along the Crystal River in Garfield County, Colorado, near Carbondale. The hatchery raises rainbow trout and Snake River cutthroat trout brood fish. The millions of eggs from these brood fish are shipped to other hatcheries to be raised for stocking.

Visiting
The Crystal River Hatchery is open to the public. It offers self-guided tours. Nearby, on the east side of the Crystal River, there is a fishing area open to the public.

References 

Buildings and structures in Garfield County, Colorado

Fish hatcheries in the United States
Tourist attractions in Colorado